The Institute for Social Policy and Understanding (ISPU) is a research organization with a focus on American Muslims. The Institute produces an annual American Muslim Poll and serves as a resource for journalists. Its reports and surveys have included topics such as political leanings, attitudes on censorship, experiences of discrimination, and responses to religiously motivated violence.

The Pulitzer Center on Crisis Reporting says, “The American Muslim Poll addresses a gaping deficit in popular knowledge: About 50 percent of Americans say they don’t know a Muslim in real life, leaving half the country to rely on the media to understand approximately 3.5 million of their compatriots, and 1.8 billion people around the world.”

Funding

The Institute for Social Policy and Understanding is funded by individual donors and institutional grants, including the Democracy Fund, New York Community Trust, W.K. Kellogg Foundation, Pillars Fund, Proteus Fund, and others.

Research areas and projects

ISPU’s research topics can be categorized in three parts: social policy, public policy, and thought leadership. Along with publishing original research, ISPU provides toolkits, interviews,  webinars,  presentations and workshops to disseminate this research to government officials, media professionals, educators, faith leaders and the general public. 

Subject matter covered by ISPU studies and projects include: Studying marriage and divorce among American Muslims, tracking challenges facing American Muslim youth, analyzing Muslim spaces (mosques, community centers, etc.), and fostering debate and discussion on CVE (Countering Violent Extremism). ISPU has also conducted studies on Islamophobia and bias in media coverage of ideologically-motivated violence in the United States.

Key leadership

Meira Neggaz, Executive DirectorDalia Mogahed, Director of Research

Scholars and fellows

ISPU works with a number of experts on a wide variety of issues related to their respective areas of research and specialty. Affiliated scholars and fellows include: Laila Alawa, Moustafa Bayoumi, Hassan Abbas, Arsalan Iftikhar, Asifa Quraishi-Landes, Ihsan Bagby, and Hatem Bazian, among others.

References 

2002 establishments in the United States
Think tanks established in 2002
Think tanks based in Washington, D.C.
Arab and Islamic culture in Dearborn, Michigan
Organizations based in Michigan